The 1975 Lamar Cardinals football team represented Lamar University as a member of the Southland Conference during the 1975 NCAA Division I football season. Led by Vernon Glass in his 13th and final season as head coach, the Cardinals compiled an overall record of 1–10 with a mark of 0–5 in conference play, placing last out of six teams in the Southland. Lamar played home games at Cardinal Stadium in Beaumont, Texas. 

Playing Southern Miss in the Louisiana Superdome and Houston in the Houston Astrodome, the Cardinals became "...the first collegiate team to play games in two domed stadiums in the same season".

Schedule

References

Lamar
Lamar Cardinals football seasons
Lamar Cardinals football